Allium daninianum is a species of onion found in Israel, Syria, Lebanon, Palestine and Jordan. It is a bulb-forming perennial with a long, flexuous scape. Umbel is lax, the pink flowers long-pedicelled and mostly drooping.

References

daninianum
Onions
Flora of Western Asia
Plants described in 2011